Several ships of the Royal Navy have been named HMS Argyll after the region of Argyll in Scotland. Her motto is ne obliviscaris (lest we forget).

 , a 50-gun fourth-rate ship of the line, launched in 1650 as the 38-gun President, renamed HMS Bonaventure in 1660, rebuilt four times and renamed HMS Argyll in 1715. She was sunk in 1748 as a breakwater.
 , a  armoured cruiser commissioned in 1905. She ran aground on the Bell Rock at the head of the Firths of Forth and Tay in 1915.
 , a Type 23 Duke-class frigate commissioned in May 1991. She has been involved in a number of deployments, most successfully during the Sierra Leonean Civil War in 2000 including Operation Barras, and Operation Telic IV in the Persian Gulf from February–August 2005.

Battle honours
Ships named Argyll have earned the following battle honours:
Passero, 1718

References

Royal Navy ship names